The G26 is a diesel-electric locomotive built in the US by General Motors Electro-Motive Diesel for export and in Australia by Clyde Engineering under licence. The G26 was developed to increase traction capacities on the tracks which supported lesser axle loadings. They were intended for main line freight and passenger traffic.

Rail companies using the G26 locomotives in the past or present include Australian Railroad Group, Freight Australia, Croatian Railways, Slovenian Railways, Serbian Railways, PT Kereta Api in Indonesia, Islamic Republic of Iran Railways, Israel Railways, Korail, ONCF in Morocco, MTR Corporation, and others.

Australia
The Victorian Railways purchased 24 G26C locomotives built in Australia by Clyde Engineering, called the X class. They are now operated by Pacific National and SCT Logistics.

Queensland Rail purchased 102 GL26C-2 locomotives in 1970, locally built by Comeng as sub-contractor for Clyde Engineering, and known as the 2100 class. Ten of the 2100 class have since been sold to FCAB, Chile.

TasRail in Tasmania, operates four GL26C locomotives formerly of Queensland Rail. Known as the 2050 class. And two G26C locomotives known as the D class which are due to be retired late in 2014.

Former Yugoslavia 

The JŽ 664 locomotives were originally acquired by the Yugoslav Railways; after the breakup of Yugoslavia the class were split between Serbia, Croatia, and Slovenia.

Brazil
Series 4500

36 G26CU were made by EMD at Illinois for the Rede Ferroviária Federal (Brazilian Federal Network) to operate on southern Brazil metre gauge lines and now, after privatisation, in ALL- América Latina Logística (Latin America Logistic). They have flexicoil trucks.

Hong Kong 
Kowloon-Canton Railway purchased three G26 CU locomotives (60-62) in 1973. These were leased to MTR Corporation in 2007 due to the merger of the two railway networks. No.60 was named Peter Quick, after the CEO of KCRC in the 1980s.

Tunisia 
5 G26CU 1972 060DH221 to 060DH225 SNCFT

Egypt 
33 G26CW 1973-1976 Egyptian Rys 3412-3429 18 3430-3444 15

Israel 

15 G26CW 1971-1978 Israeli Rys 601 to Israeli Rys 615

Turkey 

86 G26CW-2 purchased by the Turkish Railways TCDD in 1989. These locos received road numbers DE22001 to DE22086.

South Korea 
Korean National Railroad purchased 10 G26CW locomotives in 1969, numbered 6301–6310. Primarily used in passenger service, all were withdrawn from the roster by the end of the 1990s.

Indonesia 

The Indonesian State Railways purchased 15 G26MC-2U locomotives in 1986, classified as CC202 and numbered from 01-15. Later orders arrived in 1990 (15 locomotives, CC202 16-30), 1995 (3 locomotives, CC202 31-33), 2001 (4 locomotives, CC202 34-37), 2002 (2 locomotives, CC202 38-39) and finally in 2008 (9 locomotives, CC202 40-48).

The locomotives have an axle loading of 18 tons, and were originally used for bulk coal traffic between Tanjungenim (South Sumatra) and Tarahan (Lampung) pulling 50-60 coal gondolas in multiple operation. They have since been supplanted by the more modern CC205.

Beginning in 2010 a new numbering system was introduced, inserting two final digits of the date of manufacture of the locomotive. The individual numbers are restarted for each batch
Hence the first batch (CC202 01-15) becomes CC202 86 01-86 15, and the second batch (CC202 16-30) becoming CC202 90 01-90 15.

Except for CC202 90 01, scrapped after a crash in 2012, all the locomotives remain in operation.

The locomotives are based in the  depot (Lampung).

Gallery

See also
EMD GP38-2 – a contemporary 16-645E-powered EMD locomotive of similar rating, but designed for the more permissive North American loading gauge and axle load limits
List of GMD Locomotives

References 
Croatian HŽ series 2062

G26
Co-Co locomotives
EMD G26
 
Diesel-electric locomotives of Croatia
Diesel-electric locomotives of Indonesia
Diesel-electric locomotives of Iran
Diesel-electric locomotives of Israel
Diesel-electric locomotives of Morocco
Diesel-electric locomotives of South Korea
Diesel-electric locomotives of Yugoslavia
Metre gauge diesel locomotives
3 ft 6 in gauge locomotives of Australia
Standard gauge locomotives of South Korea
3 ft 6 in gauge locomotives of Indonesia